The soft sleeper, abbreviated RW or WR (CRH), is a passenger railway compartment class in the People's Republic of China. Soft sleeper is the main class on most Z-series express trains, and are grouped in several carriages as part of slower trains. They are more expensive than hard sleepers but are generally more comfortable as there is more room to move around and the bunks tend to be, albeit not always, softer in firmness. In many soft sleeper compartments, there is entertainment available through headphones connected to an LCD screen, although this is by no means universal.

Soft sleepers usually have four bunks, sometimes six.  The bunks come with a lower sheet, two pillows and a covered duvet. The compartment has a door that is lockable, although the carriage attendant has a key to open it. A large thermos of hot water, slippers and a rubbish bin are provided.

Tickets are priced slightly cheaper for the upper berths than the more desired lower berths. Due to the compartmental nature of the soft sleeper, it is sometimes appropriate for passengers to reserve tickets in batches of four to share a single compartment, though this may not always work, especially on certain routes during peak season.

Two higher travel classes are based on soft sleepers, including luxury sleeper with two bunks per compartment and single-berth compartment with only one bed per compartment.

References

Passenger rail transport in China